The 1949 Football Championship of UkrSSR were part of the 1949 Soviet republican football competitions in the Soviet Ukraine. 

The competition in all groups was conducted as a single round robin tournament.

Qualification group stage

Group 1

Group 2

Group 3

Group 4

Group 5

Group 6

Group 7

Group 8

Group 9

Group 10

Final stage

Group 1

Group 2

Championship final
 FC Metalurh Dniprodzerzhynsk – DO Kyiv 0:5

References

External links
 1949. Football Championship of the UkrSSR (1949. Первенство УССР.) Luhansk Nash Futbol.
 Group 1: ukr-football.org.ua
 Group 2: ukr-football.org.ua
 Group 3: ukr-football.org.ua
 Group 4: ukr-football.org.ua
 Group 5: ukr-football.org.ua
 Group 6: ukr-football.org.ua
 Final: ukr-football.org.ua

Ukraine
Football Championship of the Ukrainian SSR
Championship